M1908 may refer to:

 M1908 pistol
 M1908 6-inch howitzer
 M1908 variant of the M1890 12-inch mortar
 M1908 variant of the M1897 6-inch gun
 M1908 variant of the M1903 Colt pocket hammerless
 M1908 Mondragón rifle, a Mexican-designed, early semi-automatic rifle